Hsue-shen Tsien is a 2012 Chinese biographical film directed by Zhang Jianya, and starring Chen Kun, Zhang Yuqi, and Zhang Tielin. It was released on March 2, 2012.

Cast
 Chen Kun as Qian Xuesen
 Zhang Yuqi as Jiang Ying
 Pan Hong as Jiang Ying (middle age).
 Zhang Tielin as Mao Zedong
 Liu Jing as Zhou Enlai
 Lin Yongjian as Nie Rongzhen
 Wu Yue as Zhang Gongnong
 Lian Kai as Luo Youlai
 Zhang Enqi as Qian Yongzhen, Qian Xuesen's daughter.
 Zou Xuanqi as Qian Yonggang, Qian Xuesen's son.
 George Anton as Agent Pyre

Release
The film was released in China on March 2, 2012.

Accolades

References

External links
 
 

2012 films
Chinese biographical films
Films shot in the United States
Films directed by Zhang Jianya
2010s Mandarin-language films